The Soliloquies of Augustine is a two-book document written in 386–387 AD by the Christian theologian Augustine of Hippo.

The book has the form of an "inner dialogue" in which questions are posed, discussions take place and answers are provided, leading to self-knowledge. The first book begins with an inner dialogue which seeks to know a soul. In the second book it becomes clear that the soul Augustine wants to get to know is his own.

A translation of the first half of the Soliloquies into Old English is attributed to Alfred the Great, where it is known as the Blostman ('bloom') or Anthology.

References

External links
 

Catholic spirituality
Works by Augustine of Hippo
4th-century books